This page indexes the individual year in ice sports pages. Most years are annotated with one or more significant event as a reference point.

Pre-19th Century 
 Skating has been shown to have been in use since 3,000 years back.
 1541, first written record about curling
 18th Century, sports resembling bandy and ice hockey were played in the winter time in England, the Netherlands, Russia and North America.

1870s 
c. 1870
First track for bobsleigh in Switzerland
1875 
The first formal games of bandy and ice hockey are played in London, England and Montreal, British North America (Canada) respectively.

1880s 
1884 
The first formal competitions in bobsleigh takes place in St. Moritz.

1890s 
1891 
The first international bandy match is played, between an English and a Dutch team.
1892 
International Skating Union is founded.
The first written published rules of bandy.
National Bandy Association is founded in England.
1893 
Stanley Cup is awarded for the first time.

1900s 
1907 
The first Swedish national championship in bandy is played.
1908 
Figure skating at the 1908 Summer Olympics is the first ice sport included in the Olympic Games.
Ligue Internationale de Hockey sur Glace was founded.
The first Finnish national championship in bandy is played.

1910s 
1910 
The first ever European ice hockey championship is won by Great Britain.
1913 
The first ever European bandy championship is won by England.

1920s 
1923 
Ice hockey is included in the 1920 Summer Olympics.
International Bobsleigh and Skeleton Federation (FIBT) is founded
1924
The first ever Winter Olympics includes the ice sports bobsleigh, figure skating, and ice hockey. Curling was played unofficially.

1950s 
1952
The Canadian Broadcasting Corporation (CBC) began televising games in the National Hockey League.
1954
The 1954 World Championships has been described by the IIHF as "the start of the modern era of international hockey." The tournament saw the first participation of the Soviet Union in international competition.
1955
The first World Luge Championships is arranged.
The Federation of International Bandy is founded.
1957 
1957 Bandy World Championship is the first ever bandy world championship.
1959
The first ever World Curling Championships is played.

1960s 
1967
1967 NHL expansion doubles the number of ice hockey teams in NHL from the Original Six to twelve.

1970s 
1972
World Hockey Association starts its league as a competitor to NHL.
1979
World Hockey Association ceases its operations, the teams being added to the NHL.

1990s 
1998
Curling at the Winter Olympics officially for the first time.

2000s 
2000
2001
2002
2003
2004
2004 Women's Bandy World Championship is the first ever bandy world championship for women's teams.
2005
2006
2007
2008
2009

2010s 
2010
2011
2012
2013
2014
2015
2016
2017
2018
2019

References

 
Ice sports